Franklin is a town in Greater Kokstad Local Municipality in the KwaZulu-Natal province of South Africa.

References

Populated places in the Greater Kokstad Local Municipality